The 2002 Florida Citrus Bowl was a college football bowl game held on January 1, 2002 at the Florida Citrus Bowl in Orlando, Florida. The Tennessee Volunteers, champions of the Southeastern Conference's Eastern Division, defeated the Michigan Wolverines, second-place finishers in the Big Ten Conference, 45–17. Tennessee quarterback Casey Clausen was named the game's MVP. This was the last Citrus Bowl before the game was renamed the Capital One Bowl.

References

External links
 Summary at Bentley Historical Library, University of Michigan Athletics History

Florida Citrus Bowl
Citrus Bowl (game)
Michigan Wolverines football bowl games
Tennessee Volunteers football bowl games
Florida Citrus Bowl
Florida Citrus Bowl